Mr. Muthafuckin' eXquire is the debut studio album by American rapper Mr. Muthafuckin' eXquire. It was released via Chocolate Rabbit and Soulspazm on July 12, 2019. It features guest appearances from Wiki, Kast, and Iceberg Black.

Critical reception

At Metacritic, which assigns a weighted average score out of 100 to reviews from mainstream critics, the album received an average score of 67, based on 4 reviews, indicating "generally favorable reviews".

Bernadette Giacomazzo of HipHopDX gave the album a 3.7 out of 5, writing, "'Fuck' is peppered liberally throughout the album, but it's always used to buttress razor-sharp political commentary ... not just said for shock value." Phillip Mlynar of Pitchfork gave the album a 7.8 out of 10, commenting that "The tirade is eXquire in capsule form, erudite and profane, delivering pop culture and politics in a spellbinding, seamless flow."

Uproxx included it on the "Best Rap Albums of July 2019" list.

"Pink Champagne" was chosen by Clash as the "Track of the Day" on July 29, 2019.

Track listing

References

External links
 

2019 debut albums
Mr. Muthafuckin' eXquire albums